The following highways are numbered 880:

United States